Teenage Head is the debut album by the Canadian punk rock band Teenage Head.

Track listing
All songs were composed by Frank Kerr, Gordon Lewis, Steve Mahon, Nick Stipanitz.

Personnel 
Teenage Head
Frankie Venom (Kerr) - vocals
Gordon Lewis - guitar
Steve Mahon - bass
Nick Stipanitz - drums, vocals, backing vocals

Additional musicians
 Kelly Jay - piano, harp
 Dave Rave - guitar (acoustic)

Production
 Alan Caddy - producer
 Stacy Heydon - producer
 Jack Morrow - producer
 Mick Walsh - engineer
 Robin Brouwers - assistant engineer
 Peter Himmelman - assistant engineer
 Peter Moore - mastering, mixing, remastering
 Chris Spedding - mixing

References 

1979 debut albums
Teenage Head (band) albums